Herz aus Glas (German for "heart of glass") may refer to:

 Heart of Glass (film), a 1976 German film directed and produced by Werner Herzog titled Herz aus Glas in German
 Herz aus Glas (album), a 1977 album by German band Popol Vuh
 "Herz aus Glas", a 1979 German-language remake of Blondie's 1979 song "Heart of Glass" by Marianne Rosenberg
 , a 1986 song by Münchener Freiheit (band) from the album Traumziel
 "Herz aus Glas", a 2002 song by German singer Ben

See also
Heart of Glass (disambiguation)